Dame Sarah Elizabeth Oram,  (26 December 1860 – 26 June 1946) became a senior member of the Army Nursing Service (ANS) and Queen Alexandra's Imperial Military Nursing Service (QAIMNS),  and served as Principal Matron, Nursing Inspector in the QAIMNS, and was attached to the British Expeditionary Force, France, 1914–1915 and subsequently as Acting Matron-in-Chief, QAIMNS, Eastern Mediterranean Expeditionary Force, 1915–1919 during the First World War.

Background and training
Oram was born on Boxing Day, 1860 in Cirencester, the only daughter of Samuel Thomas Oram, a Surveyor of Taxes, and his wife, Sarah Oram, née Gibbons.

Oram's father died in Thirsk, Yorkshire  in 1868, and Oram was educated at a private school in London and at the Malvern Link. Oram worked as a school teacher before commencing her nurse training at The London Hospital in February 1884. Oram trained under London Hospital matron Eva Charlotte Ellis Luckes, and completed her training on 22 February 1886.

Career
Oram joined the Army Nursing Service (ANS)  as an Army Nursing Sister on 1 May 1886 and served in Egypt  for 5 years from 1891. On 11 December 1896, the London Gazette announced that she was awarded the Royal Red Cross for her role in caring for the sick and wounded soldiers who served in the Anglo-Sudan war, and the award was conferred by Queen Victoria at Windsor Castle on 5 March 1897.  After 13 years as an Army Nursing Sister, she was promoted to the position of Superintendent in May 1899 and served in the Second-Anglo Boer War in South Africa from January 1900 until 1902.   Oram was made a matron in the newly formed QAIMNS in 1903. She was promoted to Principal Matron, QAIMNS, South Africa, 1911–1914; Principal Matron, Nursing Inspector QAIMNS, 1911–1914, and attached to the British Expeditionary Force, France, 1914–1915, before her final appointment as Acting Matron-in-Chief in 1915 of the Mediterranean Expeditionary Force.

Honours
Oram was appointed a Dame Commander of the Order of the British Empire in 1919 and invested on 10 March 1920 at Buckingham Palace.

Death
Dame Sarah Oram died, unmarried, on 26 June 1946 in South Kensington, London, aged 85. The funeral took place at St George's Church, Campden Hill, and Oram was cremated at Kensal Green Crematorium on 1 July 1946.

References

External links
 British Journal of Nursing
 CROWN COPYRIGHT: THE NATIONAL ARCHIVES, WO95/3989
 Command & Control of Army Nurses, britisharmynurses.com
  (bar to RRC award, 1918)

1860 births
1946 deaths
British nursing administrators
British women in World War I
Dames Commander of the Order of the British Empire
Female nurses in World War I
Members of the Royal Red Cross
People from Cirencester
People from South Kensington
Queen Alexandra's Royal Army Nursing Corps officers
British Army personnel of World War I